Elections to Cornwall County Council were held on 5 May 1977.  The whole council of seventy-nine members was up for election and the result was that the Independents, despite losing nine seats, comfortably retained control, winning sixty-four seats. The Conservatives gained eight seats, ending as the second largest political group with thirteen, while Labour remained with only one member, the Ecology Party also won one, and (as in 1973) no one was elected as a representative of the Liberal Party.

Results

|}

References

Cornwall
1977
1970s in Cornwall